21st Century Love Songs is the tenth studio album by English rock band The Wildhearts. It was released on 3 September 2021. The album was preceded by the singles "Sort Your Fucking Shit Out" and "Splitter". Singer/guitarist Ginger Wildheart has described the album as a chance to "flex our creative muscle". Ginger has also stated that the album's attitude is inspired by the band's most successful previous album, the 1995 release P.H.U.Q.

Reception
Kerrang! described the album as combining the pop-oriented songwriting of the band's album P.H.U.Q. with the unconventional experimentation of the initially fan club-only Fishing for Luckies from the same period, while being more angry and noisy than the previous album Renaissance Men. The magazine concluded that thanks to this album, "The Wildhearts are a national treasure" in British rock music. Classic Rock magazine noted the album's stylistic variety, with "snatches of hardcore here, grunge there, a swipe or six from the power-pop aisle, a couple of lurches into thrash, and a crafty pocketing of some rockabilly." and described the album as "so full of energy, anger, humour and artistic invention that it’s clearly in quite a bit of pain." 

Metal Hammer noted that the album continues the band's strong comeback after being defunct for ten years before their previous album Renaissance Men, and noted newly pointed lyrics about mental health and politics. The album also received a positive review from Backseat Mafia, which concluded "Huge riffs and mega group choruses [are] all battered out with the same intensity the group have been performing with for decades now. The album starts with a bang and never stops."

Track listing

Personnel 
 Ginger Wildheart – guitar, vocals
 C. J. Wildheart – guitar, vocals
 Ritch Battersby – drums
 Danny McCormack – bass, vocals

Charts

References 

The Wildhearts albums
2021 albums